Ward (Vietnamese: phường) is  a type of third tier subdivision of Vietnam. It has equal status with township and commune. As of December 2022, Vietnam has a total of 1737 wards. 

Wards are subordinate to urban district, city or town as the Third Tier unit.

Currently, to manage the urban areas and their associating families, each ward is divided into neighborhoods, with each neighborhood the most basic organization of population.

Ho Chi Minh City (Saigon) has 259 wards and Hanoi has 177 wards.

References

Subdivisions of Vietnam
Vietnam 3
Ward, Vietnam